The  (SZ) is a daily (except Sundays) newspaper published in Saarland, Germany.

History and profile
It was first published as a weekly journal in 1761 under the title  (Nassau-Saarbrücken Weekly). After several changes in name and frequency, it appeared since 1861 under its current title. After the Saar Treaty in 1956, the Saarland state became its owner. It was privatized in 1969; the paper's major owner (56.1%) was the Holtzbrinck Publishing Group.  Rheinische Post Mediengruppe became the majority owner in 2013.

In 2001, Saarbrücker Zeitung received the Konrad Adenauer Foundation Prize for Local Journalism.

Saarbrücker Zeitung had a circulation of 128,174 copies in 2017.

References

Daily newspapers published in Germany
German-language newspapers
Mass media in Saarbrücken
Publications established in 1761
German news websites